Aquarion may refer to:

Companies
 Aquarion AG, a Switzerland-based water treatment company with subsidiaries in the EU-MENA region
 Aquarion Water Company, a public water supply company in Connecticut

Arts
 Genesis of Aquarion, a 2005 anime TV series 
 Genesis of Aquarion (OVA), a 2007 original video animation series 
 "Genesis of Aquarion" (song), a 2005 J-pop theme